Elachista lambeseella is a moth in the family Elachistidae. It was described by Nielsen and Traugott-Olsen in 1987. It is found in Algeria.

References

Moths described in 1987
lambeseella
Moths of Africa